The European Union Naval Force Mediterranean Operation IRINI (EUNAVFOR MED IRINI) was launched on 31 March 2020 with the primary mission to enforce the United Nations arms embargo to Libya due to the Second Libyan Civil War. Operation IRINI is a European Union military operation under the umbrella of the Common Security and Defense Policy (CSDP). The operation is expected to use aerial, maritime and satellite assets.

In September 2020, the Irini operation stated that within six months, the operation sent 14 special reports to UN Panel of Experts concerning from both sides of the conflict in Libya, performed 12 visits on collaborative merchant vessels and monitored 10 ports and landing points, 25 airports and landing strips. In addition, it made 250 requests for satellite images to the EU Satellite Centre.

Headquarters of the operation are in Rome, Italy. Italy and Greece alternate the Force Commander every six months (together with the rotation of the flagship).

Mission 
The primary mission of the operation is to ensure the implementation of the UN arms embargo. Other missions include the training of the Libyan Coast Guard and Navy, the disruption of human trafficking and halt the illicit exports of Libyan oil.

Duration 
The initial mandate of Operation IRINI lasted until 31 March 2021.

On 17 March 2021, the EU extended the operation for two more years, until the end of March 2023.

The former Operation Sophia permanently ceased its activity at the same time of the launch of IRINI.

Assets 

Naval assets (active)
: D'Estienne d'Orves-class aviso Premier-Maître L'Her
: Elli-class frigate Aegean - flagship
: Comandanti-class patrol vessel [[Italian patrol vessel Comandante Borsini|Comandante Borsini]]Air assets (active)
: Atlantique 2
: Falcon 50 from Jul, 2020
: P-3C Orion from May, 2020
: EMB-145H from Jul, 2020
: Predator B from Jul, 2020
: Swearingen Merlin from 4 May 2020
: An-28B1R Bryza from May, 2020

Previously deployed assets:

Naval assets (past)
: Cassard-class frigate Jean Bart from 4 May 2020, left 1 June 2020
: Georges Leygues-class frigate Latouche-Tréville from 7 October 2020
: Sachsen-class frigate Hamburg from 18 August 2020 to 14 December 2020.
: Type 212 submarine U-35 from 12 June 2021 to 14 December 2021.
: Hydra-class frigate Spetsai from 4 June 2020, left 17 August 2020
: Elli-class frigate Adrias: Elli-class frigate Limnos from 17 September 2020
: San Giorgio-class amphibious transport dock San Giorgio - from 17 July 2020 to 7 September 2020
: Bergamini-class frigate Carlo Margottini  - from 7 September 2020
: Comandanti-class patrol vessel Comandante Cigala Fulgosi: Tridente-class submarine NRP Tridente - from 24 June 2021 to 20 August 2021

Planned but never deployed:
: Hydra-class frigate Hydra expected May 2020, but not deployed

 Criticism 

 Government of National Accord 

In April 2020, the Government of National Accord (GNA) in Libya objected to the operation on the ground that it would affect the supply of arms from Turkey.

 Malta 

In May 2020, Malta pulled out of Operation IRINI and threatened to veto EU funds for the Operation, in a move that could have impacted on the Turkish-Libyan agreement.

Malta has complained to the European Commission that it does not give enough support to Malta on the issue of migration, the EU responded that “The Irini operation was conceived to stop the fighting in Libya and political stabilisation is a precondition to stop the migrant wave. So to stop the migration push, we need to politically stabilise Libya, and this depends on [Irini],” while Turkey has said that it will provide concrete and effective assistance to Malta. In addition, Malta, Turkey and the GNA have issued a joint statement expressing reservations about the IRINI.

 Russia 

In early June 2020, Russia was the only Security Council member which raised concerns about renewing authorization for the Operation, which was due to expire on 10 June.

 Turkey 

In June and July 2020, Turkey criticized the operation as being "not objective" and claimed that the operation is supporting Khalifa Haftar. 
In June of the same year, European diplomats and officials stated that Turkey was blocking EU attempts to secure NATO’s help for the operation. In addition, in August 2020, Turkey criticized Germany for its participation in the operation, after Germany decided to send a frigate in August. In November 2020, the Turkey’s National Security Council said that Turkey will take necessary steps in every field against the Operation Irini, after a German frigate, participating in the operation, tried to search a Turkish-flagged freighter near Libya. In addition, the Ankara Chief Public Prosecutor’s Office has launched an investigation ex officio for the incident. Furthermore, Turkey has denied the inspection of suspect Turkish vessels in many occasions (see the "Incidents" section below).

 Incidents 
In May 2020, a French war ship participating in the operation intercepted the Gabon-flagged oil tanker Jal Laxmi off the coast of Tobruk and stopped it from docking in Tobruk. The vessel had not received authorization from the Tripoli-based Libyan National Oil Corporation. Following this event, Russia raised concerns regarding the operation's authorization.

On 10 June 2020, the Greek frigate Spetsai under the command of IRINI operation attempted to inspect the Tanzanian-flagged cargo vessel Çirkin which was suspected of carrying arms to Libya, but was ordered to retreat after warnings from Turkish frigates accompanying the cargo vessel. According to sources, the Turkish commander's message was that 'the Turkish ship is under the protection of the Turkish Republic'. EU confirmed that Turkey blocked the check on the ship.  
Later, on 17 June 2020, France also accused Turkish ships of harassing a French warship from the NATO Operation Sea Guardian as they tried to inspect the Çirkin and that the Turkish Navy was using their NATO call signs while accompanying Turkish vessels suspected of breaking the UN arms embargo on Libya. According to French officials, when the French ship tried to inspect the vessel, the Turkish vessel switched off its tracking system, masked its ID number and refused to say where she was going, while the Turkish frigates flashed their radar lights three times against the French warship, suggesting a missile strike was imminent. On the other hand, Turkish officials, denied that the warship was harassed and claimed that the French warship did not establish communications with the Turkish vessel during the incident and provided fuel for the Turkish vessel. At a request of France, NATO stated on June 18 that it will investigate the incident. NATO carried out 3-week investigation into the incident, producing a 130-page report published on 1 July. The report did not include a "statement supporting the French claims that Turkish warships harassed the French warship by locking its radar on it". The report of NATO's investigation was never released publicly. Diplomats told Reuters that the investigation was too sensitive to discuss in public and does not apportion blame, adding that NATO wanted to keep Turkey onside and for this there was no willingness to point a finger. On 21 September 2020, the EU sanctioned the Turkish maritime company Avrasya Shipping which operates the Çirkin freighter, because the vessel was found to have violated the arms embargo in Libya in May and June 2020.

On 22 November 2020, the German frigate Hamburg, which participated in the operation, intercepted the Turkish 16,000-tonne freighter, Rosalina-A (or Rosaline-A), about 200 km (125 miles) north of the Libyan city of Benghazi. Soldiers from the frigate boarded the Turkish freighter in order to search it but had to abandon checks and withdraw after Turkey protested. According to the German spokesman, the Hamburg had followed standard procedure by waiting four hours for approval from the flag country, and then boarding. Later, once the objection arrived, they withdrew. The German defense ministry spokesman said that “By the time the soldiers left the ship, they had not found anything suspicious”.
Turkey said that the search team had violated international law by not waiting for permission from Turkey, adding that the ship was carrying various materials such as food and paint. Furthermore, Turkey has summoned the envoys of the European Union, Germany and Italy to Ankara  in order to protest against the operation. Turkey condemned the incident, saying that Operation Irini is a biased mission that targets Turkey and the internationally recognized Government of National Accord (GNA) in Libya.

European Union in an official statement said that the operation IRINI gave 5 hours notice to Turkey (4 hours in line with the international maritime practice + 1 hour extension at the request of the Turkish Embassy in Rome, where Operation IRINI’s Headquarters are located). After the time elapsed and no answer has received from Turkey, the soldiers boarded the ship and started the inspection in accordance with internationally agreed procedures including NATO procedures. Later, when Turkey formally and with delay notified of its refusal to grant the permission for inspection, the search operation terminated and the soldiers left the ship. Until then, nothing suspicious has found on the ship. In addition, the statement reminded that the IRINI operation is in accordance with the UN Security Council Resolutions 2292 (2016) and 2526 (2020) and that the UN Security Council Resolution 2292 (2016) calls upon all flag States to cooperate with inspections. These resolutions are binding for all UN Member States, including the Turkey. A secret EU report cited by the Deutsche Presse-Agentur, indicated that the Turkish vessel had long been watched on suspicion of making illegal arms shipments. In addition, the Der Spiegel reported that the operation Irini's military analysts, in a report for United Nations, had previously spotted arms being unloaded in the Libyan port of Misrata in satellite images. Furthermore, EU report's authors said that suspicious cargo was again sighted in November while the ship was docked in the Turkish port of Ambarli.

Turkish prosecutors launched an investigation into the incident on 27 November 2020, which is not expected to lead to arrests or the extradition of officials involved in the search.

In July 2021, Irini's forces intercepted a Zambian flag vessel called MV Gauja for being suspected of transporting illegal arms from Morocco to Libya. The Zambian government said that it does not own the vessel and that it is Russian operated.

In September 2021, an IRINI's report revealed that Turkey refused the inspection of Turkish ships heading to Libya 6 times.

In May 2022, Turkey refused to accept the inspection of the Turkish flagged vessel MSKosovak which headed to the port of Misrata in Libya.

In July 2022, Irini inspected the Equatorial Guinea flagged vessel MV VICTORY RORO and found that it breached the UN arms embargo. The vessel was suspected, since it had been identified by UN Panel of Experts of transferring military equipment in Libya before under the name MV LUCCELLO and the flag of the Comoros.
In addition, Irini asked the permission from Turkey to inspect another ship called MV Parpali, but Turkey rejected it. Irini wrote on a statement that all UN members are called by United Nations Security Council (UNSC) to cooperate with inspections.

In October 2022, Irini asked for the inspection of the Turkish flagged vessel MV Matilde A'', which was heading to Libya, in accordance with UN Security Council Resolution 2292 on the arms embargo on Libya, but Turkey refused to accept it. Same month, Irini found and seized military vehicles in the merchant vessel MV MEERDIJK coming from the United Arab Emirates and heading to Libya.

In the October 2022 Irini's report, it is mentioned that Turkey has denied the inspection of suspect Turkish vessels on nine occasions since the launch of the operation.

Presence on web and social media 
Operation IRINI web site
Operation IRINI on Twitter
Operation IRINI on Facebook
Operation IRINI on LinkedIn

See also 
Emigration from Africa
African immigration to Europe
Operation Mare Nostrum
Operation Triton
Operation Sophia
Operation Sea Guardian
Turkish military intervention in the Second Libyan Civil War

References 

Irini
Second Libyan Civil War
Turkey–European Union relations